Crypsiphila is a genus of moths in the family Geometridae.

Species
 Crypsiphila atmophanes Turner, 1947

References
 Crypsiphila at Markku Savela's Lepidoptera and Some Other Life Forms
 Natural History Museum Lepidoptera genus database

Ennominae